This is a list of football (soccer) stadiums in Ivory Coast, ranked in descending order of capacity with at least 5,000 Spectators. Some stadiums in the Côte d'Ivoire are football-specific and some are used for other purposes.

Existing stadiums

Under Construction Stadiums

Proposed Stadiums

See also 
List of association football stadiums by capacity
List of African stadiums by capacity

References

External links

 
Ivory Coast
Football in Ivory Coast
Football stadiums